The 1985 Carlsberg Challenge was a non-ranking snooker tournament, which took place between 6 and 8 September 1985. The tournament featured four professional players and was filmed in RTÉ Studios, Dublin, for broadcast on RTÉ.

Jimmy White won the tournament for the second year in a row defeating Alex Higgins 8–3.


Main draw
Results for the tournament are shown below.

References

Fosters Professional
Carlsberg Challenge
Carlsberg Challenge
Carlsberg Challenge